The Euro Tour is a series of professional pool events set around Europe, founded in 1992, and created by the European Pocket Billiard Federation. The Tour's first event was the Belgium Open, held on May 29 – 31, 1992. The event was won by Mika Immonen.

As of 2023, the Euro Tour has hosted 177 tournaments, currently in the discipline of 9-Ball, hosting between 1 to 6 events per year, since 2010. The events are part of the official Matchroom Pool world rankings list; with the rankings contributing to playing in the Mosconi Cup.

Tournament statistics

Players from 23 different countries have already won a Euro Tour tournament. The Most successful player is Ralf Souquet of Germany, who has won 23 tournaments on the Tour.

References

External links
 Official Website

Euro Tour
Cue sports leagues
Pool tours and series
Recurring sporting events established in 1992